Ingerdakh is a rural locality (a selo) and the administrative centre of Ingerdakhsky Selsoviet, Akhvakhsky District, Republic of Dagestan, Russia. The population was 1,063 as of 2010.

Geography 
Ingerdakh is located on the Karak River, 12 km east of Karata (the district's administrative centre) by road. Mesterukh is the nearest rural locality.

References 

Rural localities in Akhvakhsky District